The Voisin VI or Voisin Type 6 was a French pusher biplane bomber aircraft of World War I.

Development history
The first Voisin Type VI entered service in 1916 and replaced the Voisin III on the production lines. However, the Voisin  (as they were referred to at the Western Front) Salmson engines were held in low regard by their crews. Despite the more powerful engine, the Voisin Type VIs' payload was only marginally better and the maximum speed was only  - not enough of an improvement to make a difference, while climb rate suffered substantially.

A single Voisin Type VI was fitted with a second Salmson in the nose of the fuselage, driving a tractor propeller. It is believed that the intention was to test a possible twin pusher and tractor propeller configuration for a new bomber planned by Voisin.

Operational use
Approximately 50 Voisin Type VIs were built, and these served alongside the Voisin Type IIIs in front-line escadrilles during 1916.

Operators

French Air Force

Specifications

References

Military aircraft of World War I
1910s French bomber aircraft
Single-engined pusher aircraft
06
Aircraft first flown in 1916
Biplanes